
Route 16 is a 2-lane highway in the Canadian province of New Brunswick.  The  route begins at a T intersection with Aulac Road at Aulac and ends at the western abutment of the Confederation Bridge at Cape Jourimain.

It functions as a secondary leg of the Trans-Canada Highway to connect Prince Edward Island with the mainline Trans-Canada Highway Route 2 in Aulac.

Route 16 is the last section of the Trans-Canada in New Brunswick that is not 4-lanes with no plans in the near future to be 4 lanes.

The highway number "16" is also the number given to the branch of the Trans-Canada, the Yellowhead Highway in Western Canada. However, the numeric designation is strictly coincidental, and Route 16 is not part of that route.

Route description
Route 16 begins in Aulac at a T intersection with the Aulac Road; this road having been the original alignment of Route 2 until a 4-lane alignment opened in the early 1990s.

Route 16 continues east from Aulac as an uncontrolled access 2-lane highway passing through the following communities in rural Westmorland County while paralleling the New Brunswick-Nova Scotia inter-provincial border: Point de Bute, Upper Point de Bute, Jolicure, Halls Hill, and Baie Verte Road.

The first major intersection on Route 16 east of Aulac is a T intersection with Main Street just west of the community of Baie Verte.  Main Street is a former alignment of Route 16 and connects with Route 970 in the community of Baie Verte; this alignment was bypassed during a  realignment of Route 16 around Baie Verte and Port Elgin in the 1960s.

Route 16 continues east on this bypass alignment through Coburg before entering Port Elgin where it interchanges directly with Route 970 and the eastern terminus of Route 15 in a roundabout interchange called the Port Elgin Rotary.  The 1960s bypass reconnects with the original alignment of Route 16 at a T intersection with East Main Street on the east side of Port Elgin.

Route 16 continues east from Port Elgin as an uncontrolled access 2-lane highway passing through the following communities on the Cape Tormentine peninsula:  Timber River (where it intersects Route 960), Hardy, Melrose, and Malden.

At Malden the highway intersects with Immigrant Road in a T intersection.  Immigrant Road serves Bayfield and Cape Tormentine and is the original  alignment of Route 16 from Malden to Cape Tormentine before the Confederation Bridge opened on May 31, 1997.

From Malden to the eastern terminus at the abutment of the Confederation Bridge in Cape Jourimain, Route 16 is a controlled access 2-lane highway running on a  alignment that opened in 1997.

Traffic leaves Route 16 when entering the Confederation Bridge to cross the Northumberland Strait to Prince Edward Island before continuing on Trans-Canada Highway Route 1.

Port Elgin is the only major community along the route.

History

This highway has been part of the New Brunswick highway network since the Canadian National Railways ferry service from Cape Tormentine NB to Borden PEI began accepting automobiles in the 1920s.

The original section from Aulac to Baie Verte was known as the Baie Verte Road, the section through Baie Verte and Port Elgin was known as Main Street, the section from Port Elgin to Bayfield was known as the Immigrant Road, and the section from Bayfield to Cape Tormentine (now part of Route 955) was known as the Bayfield Road.  The Trans-Canada Highway and Route 16 designation was applied in the 1960s after the Bayfield and Baie Verte/Port Elgin realignments.

There have been three major realignments to the route:

 A  bypass of Baie Verte and Port Elgin along with the Port Elgin Rotary, constructed in the 1960s as part of the Trans Canada Highway upgrades.
 A  bypass of Bayfield between Malden and Cape Tormentine constructed in the 1960s as part of the Trans Canada Highway upgrades.
 A  realignment between Malden and Cape Jourimain constructed in 1997 as part of the Confederation Bridge project.  This saw the eastern terminus of the highway shifted from the Marine Atlantic ferry terminal in Cape Tormentine to the present eastern terminus at the bridge abutment in Cape Jourimain. This section was partially completed in the 1960s as part of a proposal at the time to construct a bridge-tunnel-causeway between Cape Jourimain and Borden.  However, the project was cancelled in the late 1960s.  The road bed and rail track bed from Malden to the water's edge in Cape Jourimain, and overpass at route 955 were constructed and lay abandoned from the late 1960s to the mid 1990s when the road section was subsequently completed for the Confederation Bridge project.  The partially-completed rail bed dating from the 1960s still exists and is now used for recreational trails at the Cape Jourimain Nature Centre.

Major intersections

References

016
New Brunswick 016
Roads in Westmorland County, New Brunswick